Taronik is a village in the Armavir Province of Armenia. The Iron Age settlement of Metsamor site is located only 1 km southwest of Taronik.

See also 
Armavir Province

References

 
 World Gazeteer: Armenia – World-Gazetteer.com
 
 
 

Populated places in Armavir Province